United Nations Security Council Resolution 174, adopted unanimously on September 12, 1962, after examining the application of Jamaica for membership in the United Nations, the Council recommended to the General Assembly that Jamaica be admitted.

See also
List of United Nations Security Council Resolutions 101 to 200 (1953–1965)

References
Text of the Resolution at undocs.org

External links
 

 0174
History of Jamaica
Foreign relations of Jamaica
 0174
1962 in Jamaica
 0174
September 1962 events